The 2014 NASCAR Sprint Cup Series was the 66th season of professional stock car racing in the United States and the 43rd modern-era Cup season. The season began at Daytona International Speedway, with the Sprint Unlimited, followed by the Daytona 500. The season ended with the Ford EcoBoost 400 at Homestead-Miami Speedway.

This season was the final year of broadcasting for both the ESPN family of networks and Turner Sports. ESPN had covered the second half of the Sprint Cup season since 2007 while Turner Sports ended a thirty-one year relationship with NASCAR on TBS and later TNT. For 2015, their portions of the season were divided between Fox Sports and NBC.

Kevin Harvick and Stewart-Haas Racing claimed the drivers' championship and owners' championship, while Chevrolet won the manufacturer's championship. In one of the largest rookie classes in recent history, Kyle Larson was named Rookie of the Year.

The 2014 season was the first Cup Series season without NASCAR legend Mark Martin since 1985 after he retired following the end of the 2013 season. Additionally, this was also the first Cup season without Ken Schrader since 2009, Tony Raines since 2001, Scott Riggs since 2003, Elliott Sadler since 1996 (he would return 3 years later in 2017), Scott Speed since 2007, and Kenny Wallace since 1989. However, excluding 2009, this was the first season without Schrader since 1983.

Teams and drivers

Complete schedule
There were 41 full-time teams in 2014.

Limited schedule

Changes

Teams
 Stewart-Haas Racing expanded to a four-car team with the addition of Kurt Busch in the No. 41. Busch previously drove the No. 78 Chevrolet for Furniture Row Racing in 2013.
 Michael Waltrip Racing downsized from a three to two car team for 2014, when sponsor NAPA Auto Parts decided to terminate their 3-year deal after the race fixing incident at the 2013 Richmond September race, shutting down the No. 56 Toyota Camry of Martin Truex Jr.
 With the No. 56 shut down, Michael Waltrip entered a partnership with the 2013 No. 87 NEMCO Motorsports team, to the new formed Identity Ventures Racing in the No. 66 with Waltrip running the restrictor plate races and Joe Nemechek and various drivers running the remainder of the races.
 Front Row Motorsports downsized from three full-time teams to two-full-time teams with the No. 35 moving to part-time. The team attempted 10 races in 2014.
 Hillman-Circle Sport LLC expanded to two full-time teams with Landon Cassill running the full season in the new No. 40, after running part-time for the team in 2013.
 Swan Racing expanded to a two-car team with the addition of Cole Whitt in the No. 26, who previously ran 7 races in Swan Racing's No. 30 in 2013. Parker Kligerman took over in the No. 30 for Swan Racing, previously running 2 races in the car in 2013. Sponsorship troubles later forced Swan Racing to sell both their cars to other teams in April 2014. The No. 26 of Whitt was sold to BK Racing, who continued to run full-time, while the No. 30 assets were sold to Xxxtreme Motorsport, shutting down the No. 30 and releasing Kligerman.

Drivers
 Kevin Harvick replaced Ryan Newman in the Stewart-Haas Racing No. 39, which was renumbered to No. 4. Harvick previously drove for Richard Childress Racing in the No. 29 the previous 12 years.
 Austin Dillon moved up to the Sprint Cup Series full-time to replace Kevin Harvick in the Richard Childress Racing No. 29, renumbered to No. 3. Announced December 11, 2013, this would make the first appearance of No. 3 in the Sprint Cup Series since the 2001 Daytona 500 and the death of Dale Earnhardt. Dillon had built a strong early career in a Childress-blessed No. 3, first in the Camping World Truck Series, then in the Nationwide Series. Childress had polled fans at the beginning of 2013 about Dillon taking No. 3, to the Sprint Cup series, which received 90% positive feedback. "That told me it was time, and if Austin wanted to it was his choice."
 Ryan Newman replaced Jeff Burton in the Richard Childress Racing No. 31. Newman drove the No. 39 for Stewart-Haas Racing in 2013.
 Martin Truex Jr. replaced Kurt Busch in the Furniture Row Racing No. 78. Truex drove the No. 56 for Michael Waltrip Racing in 2013.
 Brian Vickers became the full-time driver of the No. 55 for Michael Waltrip Racing, after running 14 races in the car in 2013.
 Kyle Larson replaced Juan Pablo Montoya in the Earnhardt Ganassi Racing No. 42. Montoya left to drive in the IndyCar Series. Larson ran full-time for Turner Scott Motorsports in the No. 32 in the Nationwide Series in 2013.
 A. J. Allmendinger replaced Bobby Labonte in the JTG Daugherty Racing No. 47 car. Allmendinger ran part-time for Daughtery and Phoenix Racing in 2013.
 Justin Allgaier replaced multiple drivers in the HScott Motorsports No. 51 car. Allgaier ran full-time for Turner Scott Motorsports in the No. 31 in the Nationwide Series in 2013.
 Michael Annett replaced Dave Blaney in the Tommy Baldwin Racing No. 7 car. Annett ran in the Nationwide Series for Richard Petty Motorsports in the No. 43 in 2013.
 Reed Sorenson replaced J. J. Yeley in the Tommy Baldwin Racing No. 36 car. Sorenson ran part-time for various Sprint Cup and Nationwide teams in 2013.
 Josh Wise replaced Michael McDowell in the Phil Parsons Racing No. 98. Wise drove for Front Row Motorsports in the No. 35 in 2013.
 Travis Kvapil and various drivers join Go FAS Racing, a team consisting of Go Green Racing and Frank Stoddard's FAS Lane Racing, for races that are not road courses (Boris Said) or restrictor plate superspeedways (Terry Labonte).
 Alex Bowman replaced Travis Kvapil in the BK Racing No. 93 car, which was renumbered to No. 23. Bowman drove for RAB Racing in the No. 99 in the Nationwide Series in 2013.
 Ryan Truex replaced David Reutimann in the BK Racing No. 83 car. Truex left after the Chicagoland race in September and was replaced by J. J. Yeley and Travis Kvapil.
 Michael McDowell replaced Scott Speed and various drivers in the part-time Leavine Family Racing No. 95 car. McDowell drove the Phil Parsons Racing No. 98 in 2013.
 J. J. Yeley replaced Scott Riggs for Xxxtreme Motorsport in the part-time No. 44.

Manufacturers
Germain Racing switched its manufacturer to Chevrolet after being with Ford since 2012. The team's original manufacturer was Toyota.

Changes
In contrast to previous seasons, NASCAR imposed several new rules changes that drastically altered how the circuit operates.

Rules changes
Beginning this year, NASCAR eliminated traditional single car qualifying in its top 3 series for all races except the Daytona 500, the Mudsummer Classic, and non-points events. Qualifying will now be done in a Formula One-style knockout qualifying. For all tracks larger than 1.25 miles in length, qualifying will consist of all entered cars on track for 25 minutes. The fastest 24 move onto a 10-minute session, while the final 12 drivers compete for the overall pole in a 5-minute session. For tracks shorter than 1.25 miles as well as road courses, all entered cars will qualify in a 30-minute session, while the 12 fastest will compete in a final 10 minute session. A similar system involving groups of cars being released at five-second intervals was used at Sonoma Raceway and Watkins Glen International in 2013.

The rule was modified slightly for restrictor plate races (other than the Daytona 500, which maintains its single car pole qualifying and Budweiser Duel qualifying races) beginning at Talladega in the October race. During sessions at restrictor plate tracks, such as at Talladega's spring race, drivers had either ridden around the track at slow speeds or stopped on pit road for several minutes to avoid aiding others in the draft. In an effort to avoid this, a new procedure was implemented:
 NASCAR will randomly split the field into two groups for session 1. Each group will get 5 minutes of track time. The fastest 24 cars from either group will advance to session 2.
 These 24 cars will get 5 minutes of track time for session 2. The fastest 12 cars in session 2 will advance to session 3.
 Session 3 remains unchanged: 12 cars competing for overall pole in a 5-minute session.
 Statically set car at race ride height—eliminate pre- and post-race front height rules and inspection.
 The use of a front splitter with a square leading edge.
 Skirts at 4-inch minimum ground clearance on both the left and right sides.
 Rear fascia trimmed 1.375 inches higher in current scallop region.
 The use of a .750-inch higher 8-inch high rear spoiler except at Daytona and Talladega.
 The use of a 43-inch wide by 13-inch long radiator pan.

New Chase format
On January 30, 2014, NASCAR announced radical changes to the format for the season-ending Chase for the Sprint Cup.
 The group of drivers in the Chase will now officially be called the NASCAR Sprint Cup Chase Grid.
 The number of drivers qualifying for the Chase Grid will expand from 12 to 16.
 15 of the 16 slots in the Chase Grid are reserved for the drivers with the most race wins over the first 26 races, provided that said drivers are in the top 30 in series points and have attempted to qualify for each race (with rare exceptions). The remaining spot is reserved for the points leader after 26 races, if that driver does not have a victory. If fewer than 16 drivers have wins in the first 26 races, the remaining Chase Grid spots are filled by winless drivers in order of season points. As in the recent past, all drivers on the Chase Grid have their driver points reset to 2,000 prior to the Chase, with a 3-point bonus for each win in the first 26 races.
 The Chase will be divided into four rounds. After each of the first three rounds, the four Chase Grid drivers with the fewest season points are eliminated from the Grid and championship contention. Any driver on the Chase Grid who wins a race in the first three rounds automatically advances to the next round. Also, all drivers eliminated from the Chase have their points readjusted to the regular-season points scheme.
 Challenger Round (races 27–29)
 Begins with 16 drivers, each with 2,000 points plus a 3-point bonus for each win in the first 26 races.
 Contender Round (races 30–32)
 Begins with 12 drivers, each with 3,000 points.
 Eliminator Round (races 33–35)
 Begins with 8 drivers, each with 4,000 points.
 NASCAR Sprint Cup Championship (final race)
 The last 4 drivers in contention for the season title start the race at 5,000 points, with the highest finisher in the race winning the Cup Series title.

2014 NASCAR realignment
The 2014 schedule had a few changes from the 2013 schedule, all of them among the first fifteen races. The dates for the spring races at Darlington Raceway and Kansas Speedway (Bojangles' Southern 500 and 5-hour Energy 400 respectively) were swapped, giving Kansas its first primetime Sprint Cup race,  Texas Motor Speedway's spring race was changed from a Saturday night to a Sunday afternoon race for this year only due to conflicts with the NCAA basketball finals, it and Martinsville Speedway's STP 500 were moved up a week, the new Darlington date moved to Texas's original spot on the schedule, and the spring off-weekend moved to Kansas' original date, to coincide with Easter.

Other changes
NASCAR restructured the penalties and appeals system allowing penalties to be more consistent. The appeals process also makes NASCAR's basis for issuing the penalty public at the first appeal instead of the last. Minor changes were made to the Gen-6 race car. Rules on ride height were loosened, and the top of the rear spoiler is now made of clear material to give drivers more visibility. After a six-hour delay at the first Chase race in 2013 at Chicagoland, NASCAR will now make the Air Titan available at all Sprint Cup Series races and accompanying races at no extra charge. The Air Titan has also been improved to Air Titan 2.0 shortening track drying time even further.

In addition, starting in 2014, drivers have a winner's decal placed behind the driver's name on the side of the car for each race victory they earn during the season.

Schedule
The final calendar was released on October 15, 2013, comprising 36 races, as well as two exhibition races. The schedule also includes two Budweiser Duels, which are the qualifying races for the Daytona 500.

Season summary

Race reports
Speedweeks 2014

Speedweeks 2014 kicked off with the 2014 Sprint Unlimited. Denny Hamlin started on pole and won all three segments in a bizarre race that featured 10 of the 18 cars crashing out, along with three more being damaged, and the pace car catching on fire. Hamlin led 27 of the 75 laps and won the race ahead of Brad Keselowski, Kyle Busch, and Joey Logano.

Qualifying for the front row took place the next day, with rookie Austin Dillon, fielding the famed No. 3 car, appearing for the first time since the 2001 Daytona 500, winning the pole. Martin Truex Jr. won the outside pole.

During the first practice session on Wednesday, a five-car wreck happened and ended with rookie Parker Kligerman on his roof; several teams had to use back-up cars. The wreck brought out a red flag that prematurely ended the session. The second session was run without major incident.

The 2014 Budweiser Duels were fairly uneventful, with Matt Kenseth winning the first race that ran caution-free, and Denny Hamlin winning the second that had only one caution–a large wreck on the last lap that started when Jimmie Johnson ran out of fuel. Jamie McMurray, Martin Truex Jr., and Michael Waltrip, among others, were involved. Clint Bowyer flipped his car during the accident.

Round 1: Daytona 500

Austin Dillon started on pole, but led only the first lap. The first 35 laps featured Denny Hamlin and Kurt Busch taking turns leading, and Kyle Larson struggling with two flat tires. During the second caution for an engine problem on Martin Truex Jr.'s car, it began to rain, and by lap 39, the red flag was displayed with Kyle Busch as the leader. The red flag lasted over six hours as track-drying was delayed due to ongoing rain showers. The race went back green under the lights, and Dale Earnhardt Jr. dominated the final part of the race. Several minor "big ones" broke out late in the race, but Earnhardt held on to win his second career Daytona 500.

Round 2: The Profit on CNBC 500

Brad Keselowski and Joey Logano took the front row for Team Penske, but Kevin Harvick dominated most of the race. Harvick would hang on to win the race, his first for with his new team, Stewart-Haas Racing. Daytona 500 winner Dale Earnhardt Jr. finished in second.

Round 3: Kobalt 400

Joey Logano took the pole, and after a race with several different strategies and leaders, Dale Earnhardt Jr. found himself in the lead trying to make it to the finish on fuel mileage. However, Earnhardt ran out of fuel with just over half a lap to go, and Brad Keselowski took advantage to win the race. Since they had a sizable lead on the rest of the field, Earnhardt would get back going with what little fuel he had left and finish in second position.

Round 4: Food City 500

The race started on time, but, just like the Daytona 500, rain delayed the race in the early going. The race finally got restarted under the lights several hours later. After many of the frontrunners, including Kyle Busch, Kurt Busch, Matt Kenseth, and Jimmie Johnson, suffered from numerous problems, Carl Edwards found himself up front late in the race. Edwards held on as rain caused the race to end under caution after 503 laps (a caution had waved with two to go and the race had not yet been restarted for the green-white-checker).

Round 5: Auto Club 400

Matt Kenseth started on pole, but gave way to Brad Keselowski, who started on the front row and had the fastest car at the beginning. After he led 38 laps. Jimmie Johnson would take over the lead, leading 104 of the race's 200 laps. Many cautions waved during the race because of drivers repeatedly cutting down left side tires. Kenseth had the first pit box and would take advantage of it a few times, coming out in the lead. Kenseth would lead three or four laps after the restarts, then Johnson would pass him as Kenseth's car faded back. With seven laps remaining, Johnson had a left-front tire go down, giving the lead to his teammate Jeff Gordon. Keselowski suffered his third left-rear tire failure a lap later but stayed out of harm's way. The same fate befell Marcos Ambrose on the same lap. Gordon, who had a large lead, slowed his pace and almost made it to the finish, but Clint Bowyer spun with less than three laps to go, thanks to a flat left-rear tire. The caution waved to set up the green-white-checker finish. On the restart, Gordon got shuffled back to finish in 13th. Kyle Busch passed Tony Stewart and Kurt Busch (both of whom only took two tires during pit stops), bringing rookie Kyle Larson with him. Kyle Busch held off Larson to win his first race of the year. Larson finished second and Kurt Busch finished third. Kenseth also passed Stewart on the last lap to finish in fourth. Stewart came home fifth.

Round 6: STP 500

Kyle Busch started on pole, and he, Matt Kenseth, and Jimmie Johnson took several turns leading through the first 70 laps as Kasey Kahne, Brad Keselowski, Kurt Busch, Austin Dillon, and others were caught up in early accidents. Joey Logano then took over the lead from Kyle Busch for a few laps, but yielded to Johnson and Kenseth. Meanwhile, Kurt Busch and Keselowski would continuously bump and race each other very hard because of an incident on pit road several laps before. This would ultimately lead to a caution for Ricky Stenhouse Jr. running up into the wall after checking up for the ongoing battle between Busch and Keselowski. Kenseth retook the lead during pit stops under the caution, but quickly yielded to Logano after the restart. After another caution and restart, Johnson took over from Logano. Johnson, Logano, Hamlin, and Kenseth all faded soon after, and after lap 165, Greg Biffle, Marcos Ambrose, and A. J. Allmendinger became the new top-three. After another caution for a spin by Casey Mears, Ambrose won the race off of pit road to become the new leader. Kenseth and Johnson would get by Ambrose after several laps, but another caution would wave after Jamie McMurray got bumped into the wall by Dale Earnhardt Jr. After the restart, Kenseth would lose the lead to Johnson, then fade back to tenth after getting stuck on the outside.

Caution number seven waved around lap 220, after David Gilliland turned Alex Bowman into the wall. Earnhardt, Allmendinger, and Kurt Busch stayed out, but everyone else pitted, with Logano coming off of pit road first. After another quick caution and restart for debris, Kurt Busch took the lead from Earnhardt on lap 243, and Johnson took over from Busch two laps later. The ninth caution waved at lap 250 after Ryan Truex go turned into the wall, and all of the leaders made pit stops. Kenseth, however, stayed out and reassumed the lead, with Tony Stewart taking second. Johnson and Earnhardt would come out of pit road first to restart third and fourth, respectively. Earnhardt took the lead on lap 260, Johnson took over once again on lap 265, and then Clint Bowyer charged to the front and took the lead on lap 284 but gave it back to Johnson four laps later and faded back a bit. Meanwhile, Kenseth and Stewart, who both stayed out during the previous caution, would fall back quickly, with Kenseth being lapped on lap 304 and Stewart losing a lap ten laps later. Other drivers had problems as well, with Alex Bowman cutting a tire and Denny Hamlin getting a windshield tear-off stuck over the opening to his left-front brake duct. Lap 315 saw the tenth caution as Joe Nemechek slammed the wall, and all of the leaders pitted and retained their positions. The eleventh caution flew on lap 340 as 20th-place Kyle Larson spun out of turn two, and the leaders pitted once again, with Johnson and Bowyer keeping their first and second-place positions. Bowyer nosed ahead on the restart and led a lap, but Johnson retook the lead the next lap as another caution waved for debris. Edwards would nose ahead on the next restart but fail to lead a lap before Johnson pulled away. The 13th caution flew on lap 411 as Brad Keselowski spun Martin Truex Jr. in turn two, and on the ensuing pit stops, an exiting Edwards hit an entering Matt Kenseth, spinning Kenseth around backwards into his pit stall. Johnson retained the lead on the restart, ahead of Bowyer and Edwards. Kurt Busch would then move up second and challenge Johnson but fell back and was passed by Bowyer. Bowyer then chased Johnson down, and, after a slip by Johnson, took the lead on lap 450. On lap 459, Carl Edwards spun to bring out the 14th caution, and Bowyer fell back to tenth during pit stops, allowing Johnson to retake the lead ahead of Joey Logano. Johnson barely retained the lead on the lap 466 restart, but began to pull away as Kurt Busch slipped into second. Busch would then run down and pass Johnson in about five laps, but Johnson would once again retake the lead on lap 483, with that pass setting a new track record with 32 lead changes. Busch retook the lead on lap 490 (the 33rd lead change) and held off Johnson to break a winless drought dating back to the 2011 AAA 400, ironically another race that Johnson led the most laps in but was beaten late by Busch. Earnhardt finished third, Joey Logano fourth, Marcos Ambrose fifth, and Matt Kenseth sixth.

Round 7: Duck Commander 500

The race's start was delayed due to rain, marking the third time in seven race weekends in 2014 that weather affected a race. Eventually, NASCAR announced that the race would be postponed to Monday, April 7, and started at 12 p.m., marking the season's first rainout. The race started under green-yellow conditions to allow track workers to dry the track from the rain while green flag laps were counted under yellow flag conditions. Dale Earnhardt Jr. brought out the first yellow of the race two laps after it officially went green on Lap 11 when he clipped the wet infield grass on the front stretch, causing the splitter to dig in and damage the front end of his car before it caught fire. Teammate Jimmie Johnson received some damage from the dirt dug up by Earnhardt Jr. Joey Logano made a last lap pass on Jeff Gordon to win the race.

Round 8: Bojangles' Southern 500

Kevin Harvick started on the pole, led the most laps, and passed Dale Earnhardt Jr. with two laps to go to win his second race of the year at Darlington Raceway.

Round 9: Toyota Owners 400

Joey Logano scored his second win of the season after a nine lap battle for the win.

Round 10: Aaron's 499

Denny Hamlin scored his first victory of the season, and first career win at Talladega Superspeedway, after taking the lead from Kevin Harvick with two laps to go.

Round 11: 5-hour Energy 400

Jeff Gordon took the lead with eight laps to go and held off a last lap charge by Kevin Harvick for his 89th career win.

Exhibition: NASCAR Sprint All-Star Race

For the first time, the Sprint Showdown was held the day before the All-Star Race, with Clint Bowyer winning and A. J. Allmendinger finishing second to advance to the All-Star Race. Josh Wise was the winner of the fan vote to be the third driver to advance.

For the main race, Carl Edwards took the pole in a unique qualifying session, but Kyle Busch won the first 20-lap segment. However, he and Joey Logano crashed in the second segment, followed soon after by Allmendinger. Kasey Kahne won the second and third segments, but faded in the fourth after hitting the wall, along with Ryan Newman. Kevin Harvick would later win the fourth segment. On the restart for the last segment, which was ten laps, Jamie McMurray passed Edwards and held off Harvick to win his first All-Star race.

Round 12: Coca-Cola 600

Jimmie Johnson won the pole, led the most laps, and won the race ahead of Kevin Harvick, after the latter was slowed down by pit difficulties late and could not recover in time. Matt Kenseth, Carl Edwards, and Jamie McMurray rounded out the top five. Kurt Busch and Danica Patrick both suffered blown engines in the race, with Busch's engine failure ending his chance of completing all  of the Indianapolis 500 and Coca-Cola 600, an act known as "Double Duty".

Round 13: FedEx 400

Brad Keselowski started on pole, but Kyle Busch led the early part of the race. Jimmie Johnson eventually passed Kyle Busch for the lead. Clint Bowyer got into Kyle Busch, who wound up hitting the wall and ending his day. Greg Biffle and Ricky Stenhouse Jr. collided on the backstretch, also involving Landon Cassill, Ryan Truex, and Justin Allgaier. The race was red flagged in order to clean up. After the race resumed, Kevin Harvick took the lead from Johnson. Jamie McMurray hit a piece of concrete in turn two, which resulted in a second red flag in order to repair the hole in the track. The concrete ended up causing damage to the bridge over the track in that location. Harvick continued to lead after the red flag until having to pit for a flat tire, yielding the lead to Matt Kenseth. Johnson took the lead from Kenseth and dominated the remainder of the race, winning his second consecutive race and his ninth win at Dover.

Round 14: Pocono 400

Denny Hamlin took the pole with a new track record, but Brad Keselowski led the most laps. Jimmie Johnson started 20th and worked up to 5th; however, his progress was stunted by a pit-road collision with Marcos Ambrose. Other contenders Tony Stewart and Kevin Harvick were done in by a pit road speeding penalty and a flat tire, respectively. Kasey Kahne was then taken out after being forced up into the wall by Kyle Busch, causing a crash that also involved Carl Edwards. After the final restart, Keselowski picked up a large piece of debris on his grill and got passed by Dale Earnhardt Jr. while trying to pull up behind the slower Danica Patrick to remove the debris. Earnhardt would continue to lead and pick up his first career victory at Pocono. The win was the fourth in a row for Hendrick Motorsports in 2014, and the fourth in a row for Hendrick at Pocono with four different drivers.Round 15: Quicken Loans 400Jimmie Johnson took the lead with ten laps remaining to take his first win at Michigan International Speedway. This was his first career win at Michigan, after numerous unsuccessful attempts that ended with crashes, engine failures, or running out of fuel. "We had figured out every way to lose this race," Johnson said after winning at Michigan for the first time in 25 tries. "And today we were able to get it done. "We really were in a win-win situation," he added. "Those guys still had to come to pit road to make it to the end. Once I got an idea of how the race was unfolding, I knew we were in the catbird seat and were able to take advantage of it. When it came down to strategy in the end, which we all knew it would at Michigan, Chad nailed the strategy."Round 16: Toyota/Save Mart 350Carl Edwards held off a last lap charge from Jeff Gordon to win the Toyota/Save Mart 350 at Sonoma Raceway. “Real tough. That last lap was ugly. I grew up watching Jeff Gordon do well here so to have him in my mirror is special," Edwards said. "This team has been working very hard. The whole group has. It's very special to be a part of something like this.”Round 17: Quaker State 400In what was an absolutely dominating performance from Team Penske, Joey Logano and Brad Keselowski combined to lead 236 of the 267 laps and Keselowski led 199 laps to win the Quaker State 400 at Kentucky Speedway. He described his car as "awesome" and that his crew did a "great job."Round 18: Coke Zero 400Aric Almirola scored his first career victory in the rain-shortened Coke Zero 400 at Daytona International Speedway. He said he could not "dream" of a better place to get his first win. Kurt Busch was penalized 10 points for a technical infraction following post-race inspection.Round 19: Camping World RV Sales 301Brad Keselowski staved off a green-white-checker charge by Kyle Busch to win. "I think it is definitely good for when we come back here in September but past success doesn't guarantee future success," he said. "We have to keep working and plugging away. I am sure a lot of guys will be stronger and hopefully we will be too."Round 20: Brickyard 400Jeff Gordon scored his record 5th win in the Brickyard 400 after passing Kasey Kahne on a restart with 17 laps to go. The race was dominated by a variety of pit strategies. Kasey Kahne led the most laps in the race with 70 as Hendrick powered cars led 127 of the 160 laps. "Those emotions take over. There's nothing better, especially in a big race, coming to Victory Lane with your family here," said an emotional Gordon. "I was trying so hard with 10 to go not to focus on the crowd. I didn't want to think about it too much, but you can't help it." "Looking back, I should have chosen the (outside lane)," Kahne said. "They pretty much let Jeff control that restart. I took off and never spun a tire and the inside had been more grip throughout the race and I started on the inside and I thought it was a great decision. But I didn't spin a tire and Jeff drove right by me before we were even got to the second (restart line)."Round 21: Gobowling.com 400Despite having Kevin Harvick filling his rearview mirror, Dale Earnhardt Jr. was able to maintain the lead to complete the first Pocono sweep since Denny Hamlin did it in 2006. "We definitely went home from the last race and made our car better," Earnhardt Jr. said "That's what I'm proud of this team for. It takes a really, really smart guy to understand what to do to take those gambles. Sometimes they pay off, sometimes they don't." "This hasn't been one of my better race tracks and the cars have been fast both races here," Harvick said after finishing runner-up. "Today we were able to capitalize on it and get a good finish." We had a fast car all day. Steve's strategy was perfect at the end. I don't know if anyone knew what was going on there, but it was pretty awesome."Round 22: Cheez-It 355 at The GlenA. J. Allmendinger held off a hard charging Marcos Ambrose with two laps remaining to score his first career Sprint Cup Series victory. "My gosh, I can't believe we've won a NASCAR Sprint Cup race," Allmendinger said. "With this whole 47 team, [team owners] Tad Geschickter, Jody Geschickter, Brad Daugherty, all the great sponsors we have, our first Cup victory together, my first victory...I love these guys. I just wanted it so bad for them and this team. They work so hard. I wasn't gonna let Marcos take that from me." "First of all, congratulations to AJ and the 47 team," Ambrose said. "They deserved that win. I left nothing on the table. I tried to rattle his cage and couldn't shake him. We raced fair and square to the end there. It was a tough couple laps but it was fair. We were both giving it to each other pretty hard. No harm, no foul. We just came up a little short."Round 23: Pure Michigan 400Jeff Gordon took the lead from Joey Logano on the final restart and sailed to victory lane for the 91st time in his career. Gordon had this to say, "I got a really good restart, and I got to his quarter panel in Turn 1 and I was able to drag him back and it allowed me to get the momentum and get by him." "I had (Gordon) cleared," Logano said. "I should have pulled down in front of him. He got next to me, and I couldn't get away."Round 24: Irwin Tools Night RaceJoey Logano took the lead with 45 laps to go and had to hold off a late race charge by Brad Keselowski to score his third win of the 2014 season. "It's awesome," Logano said in Victory Lane. "I've never won more than one race in a season, and now I've won three." "Joey just ran a great race and we were really strong in that midsection and ... we got it back a little bit on that last run," Keselowski said. "Our car was just about equal to Joey's but he just had better track position than on us."Round 25: Oral-B USA 500Kasey Kahne took the lead on the second Green-White-Checker attempt and held off Matt Kenseth to score his first win of the season. "Yeah, man, it took a lot," said Kahne. "We were all over the place during the race but the guys stayed with me and worked hard. On those restarts – I didn't know what would happen because I had great restarts all night and I struggle with restarts a lot. That's big, because that is one of the things you have to be good at and it worked really well tonight. Yeah, we are locked in and I hate it comes down to this Atlanta or Richmond just about every year for me," said Kahne. "Sometimes we are in, sometimes we are out. But thankful that now at HMS I have been in all three years now." "Those last two laps were really intense," Kenseth said. "Things are looking up. I'm looking forward to the next 11." "I couldn't capitalize, couldn't get the restarts and couldn't accelerate," Denny Hamlin said. "We just came up short. Third is about the place car we had tonight."Round 26: Federated Auto Parts 400Brad Keselowski led 383 laps on his way to his fourth win of the season. "What a night," said Keselowski. "Part of me, I pulled into victory lane and I pinched myself once to make sure I wasn't dreaming. These are nights you don't forget as a driver and you live for. The Miller Lite Ford Fusion was just flying, and this is I'm couldn't ask for a better way to enter the Chase than to win and take the first seed. We're ready. We want to run for another Cup. We really feel like this team has it." "You know, it's definitely frustrating not making that Chase, but like I said, when you do make the Chase, you want it to be for a championship, not just ride around in it," said a disappointed Clint Bowyer.Round 27: MyAFibStory.com 400The Chase-Opening race at Chicagoland Speedway started with qualifying being rained-out and Kyle Busch starting on Pole for being the fastest in first practice, and Chase Seed #1 Brad Keselowski wound up starting 25th for the 267 lap event. Busch led 46 laps early on, but the race saw comers and goers as it saw only a few cautions for the first 3/4 of the event. Jeff Gordon, Jamie McMurray, Keselowski, and Kevin Harvick (who led a race-high 79 laps) took turns at the front over the course of 100 laps of green. Keselowski and Harvick both suffered loose wheels and had to start at the tail-end of the lead lap. Chase driver Aric Almirola was leading on series of green flag pit stops with 37 to go when his engine blew and was forced to retire. Rookie Kyle Larson wound up taking the lead in the late going with a superior machine, battling Harvick, Gordon, and Keselowski in the late going with Keselowski making a three-wide move in between Larson and Harvick, taking the lead for good. With 10 laps to go, the final caution came out after Ricky Stenhouse Jr. and Danica Patrick got together in Turn 4. On the final restart, Keselowski got away easy, Harvick fell to 5th, and Keselowski the #1 seed scored his 5th win of the season and second at Chicagoland. Gordon beat Larson for 2nd, and Joey Logano blew up out of Turn 4, but streaked across the finish line up in smoke to finish 4th. “I don’t really know what happened," Keselowski said. "I just know we got to the lead. I saw Kyle and Kevin racing each other really hard, they were aggressively side drafting and I was waiting for an opportunity to strike and it came. The car stuck and everything came together."Round 28: Sylvania 300Joey Logano took off on the first Green-White-Checker attempt to score his fourth victory of the season. “It feels good to go into the next one,” Logano said. “We’ve got to keep doing what we’re doing though. We’ve got to keep our eye on the prize and think about the big trophy at the end.”Round 29: AAA 400Kevin Harvick started on pole and dominated most of the first half of the race. Cautions flew for debris on lap 62, Ricky Stenhouse Jr. brushing the wall on lap 75, and debris again on lap 125. Brad Keselowski took the lead from Harvick on lap 148. After a caution for J. J. Yeley scraping the wall on lap 171, Harvick regained the lead. After a round of green flag pit stops, Harvick cut a tire and brought out the caution on lap 254. Keselowski took over the race lead. Jeff Gordon took the lead from Keselowski on lap 305 and continued on for the win, the 92nd of his career. Following this race, A. J. Allmendinger, Kurt Busch, Greg Biffle, and Aric Almirola were eliminated from the Chase.Round 30: Hollywood Casino 400On the final restart with 28 laps to go, Ryan Newman lost the lead to Joey Logano and he held off a hard-charging Kyle Larson to score his fifth win of the season. “It was a crazy race, and I had such a fast Pennzoil Ford," said Logano. "It is awesome to be back in victory lane. When the top opened up, the car just took off. Me and the No. 42 (Kyle Larson) were the only ones that seemed to be able to run up there. We had a cat and mouse (with Larson) during portions of the late run. I just had to be able to work the traffic and keep my momentum up. We just have to keep capitalizing going forward.”Round 31: Bank of America 500Kevin Harvick shot ahead of Jeff Gordon on the final restart with two laps remaining to win the Bank of America 500 at Charlotte Motor Speedway. “Oh, we came here and tested thinking that this was going to be the hardest round to get through because of Talladega,” Harvick said. “There’s so much that you can’t control there. We wanted to try to control the things that we could control. We felt like Kansas and here (Charlotte) were playing to our strengths; and just see where it fell after that once we get to the next round. So I’m really proud of everybody at SHR. I’m really proud of all my guys on this team. I just can’t thank everybody enough.” "I'm really proud of that finish, really proud of that effort," Gordon said. " ... Kevin was tough. I knew he was going to be tough once he got out there."Round 32: GEICO 500Brad Keselowski held off hard-charging Ryan Newman and Matt Kenseth to win the GEICO 500. “I can’t believe it,” Keselowski said. “Talladega is such a wild card and to be able to win here you have to catch breaks and make your own breaks, a little of both. I can’t believe we won at Talladega. This race is the scariest of the three in the bracket. To be able to win here is really a privilege, it really is.” Kyle Busch, Dale Earnhardt Jr., Kasey Kahne and Jimmie Johnson were the four drivers who were eliminated. "We had a real good car most of the day," Earnhardt said. "Got real loose, kind of shuffled out. ... It's just hard racing. That's the way it goes at the end of these races. We weren't in good position."Round 33: Goody's Headache Relief Shot 500Dale Earnhardt Jr. took the lead from Tony Stewart with four laps to go and held off a hard charging Jeff Gordon to score his first career win at Martinsville Speedway. “Oh, man, been trying to win here for so many years,” Earnhardt said. “Real emotional win. I can’t believe we won here. We’re going to drink a lot of beer tonight. It’s a real emotional win. This team on pit road was great and Steve (Letarte, crew chief) and the guys did a real good job all day. They gave me a great shot at it there with the call at the end to take tires. I can’t believe we won here. This means so much to all of us. It’s just real emotional.” "That means so much to Hendrick Motorsports," Gordon said. "That's the best way you can possibly pay tribute to those that we lost 10 years ago. To have a 1-2 finish, that's pretty awesome. I would have loved to have gotten that win to move on to Homestead, but this is certainly a great start for us." "I thought we had the car to beat," Gordon said. "Those last couple of laps were just wild. This means so much to Hendrick Motorsports. It's the best way to pay tribute to everyone we lost 10 years ago. I would have loved to get that win to move on to Homestead. But I'm real happy for Dale. I know this means so much to him."Round 34: AAA Texas 500Jimmie Johnson held off Brad Keselowski and Kevin Harvick to score his 70th career win. “It’s a testament to this team and the fact that we’ll never give up,” said Johnson. “We’ll always keep fighting and keep trying to make our cars better. We’re not in the Chase and not where we want to be - fighting for the championship.”

There was a brawl on pit road involving Jeff Gordon, Brad Keselowski and Kevin Harvick. Keselowski and Harvick were parked in the post-race impound area where the cars that finished second through sixth are held for post-race inspection. Gordon pulled his car and parked it right beside Brad's car. He got out and had a level-headed conversation with the driver of the No. 2 Ford that seemed to make him more angry. As Keselowski was putting on his Miller Lite cap, Kevin proceeded to shove him towards Gordon and all hell broke loose. Multiple pit crews from the three racing stables as well as Paul Menard's crew were involved (Keselowski's spot in the impound area was in the pit stall of the No. 27 car). ESPN's Jamie Little was caught in the middle of it. “We’re racing for the win,” said Keselowski of the on track contact. “[Wasn't trying] to wreck him, just racing hard. He left a hole and you know, everything you watch in racing, you leave a hole, you’re supposed to go for it. It closed back up and we made contact. I don’t want to ruin anyone’s day. I want to win the race and that was our opportunity. Just didn’t come together.” “I spun the tires a little bit but I got a pretty decent start and we went down into one and I just wanted to get to the outside of the 48 [Johnson] and out of nowhere, I got slammed by the 2 and it cut my left rear tire. He's just a dipshit," Gordon said in a nationally televised interview on ESPN. "I don't know how he's ever won a championship. I'm just sick and tired of him. ... That was a huge race for us. I'm proud of Jimmie Johnson for winning that race. I didn't want that you-know-what (Keselowski) to win that race. ... (Keselowski) gets himself in this position himself and as far as I'm concerned he's got to pay the consequences. … It's total crap. The kid is just doing stuff way over his head." “I'm not trying to sit here and sugarcoat it and try to be The Intimidator,’’ Keselowski said. “That's not what I'm trying to say. My expectation is if there's a gap, they'll go for it. If there's a gap, I'll go for it. If it closes up, there's contact, then that's racing. And that's what happened today. Will those guys race me hard or harder than others? Absolutely, I'm certain they will. But that's just part of it. I can't fault them for that. I just feel like I have to go for the gap if it's there, and I have to race the way I race or I won't even be in NASCAR. I'd rather have enemies in NASCAR than have friends and be sitting at home.’’ “If you’re going to drive like that, you better be willing to fight,’’ Harvick said he told Keselowski. “He was going to stand behind his guys. Jeff Gordon deserved to at least have a face-to-face conversation with him. I wasn’t standing up for anybody. (Keselowski) just ran over (Gordon). He was standing back behind all his guys, not wanting to defend what he did. I said, ‘You’re the problem, get in your own fight.’ ‘’ Robin Pemberton, NASCAR's senior vice president of competition, said that series officials will review what took place to determine what, if any, penalties will be issued. “Holding onto each other and grabbing… that's one thing. When punches are landed, it's a different scenario," Pemberton said.Round 35: Quicken Loans Race for Heroes 500Kevin Harvick dominated the race to score the victory. "Wow. I guess that's what it feels like to hit a walkoff in extra innings. I mean this thing -- both races here -- has been bad to the bone," Harvick said after winning his fourth race at this 1-mile oval in the last five tries. Harvick would not have made the final four to race for the title without a win. I could tell that we were going to have to win because everybody was running in the front of the pack that we were racing against. I think this says a lot about our team. We had our backs against the wall. We're in victory lane and we get to go on." In the final turn, Ryan Newman sent Kyle Larson into the wall to secure his place in the championship race. “I just gave it my all,” Newman said. “I wasn’t proud of it but did what I had to get to this next round. That little boy has got a lot of things coming in this sport and he used me up like that in a truck at Eldora a couple years ago. From my standpoint, I call it even but I think if he was in my position, he’d have done the same thing.” "Coming to the finish, there were a lot of cars racing really hard,” said Larson today. “I knew (Newman) was right around me and knew he needed to gain some spots to keep from getting eliminated from the Chase. It's a little upsetting he pushed me up to the wall, but I completely understand the situation he was in,” said Larson, “(I) can't fault him for being aggressive there. I think a lot of drivers out here would have done something similar if they were in that position." Kevin Harvick (with the much-needed win), Joey Logano, Denny Hamlin, and Ryan Newman were the four drivers who will race for the championship, which also meant that NASCAR will be having a new Sprint Cup Series champion. Jeff Gordon, Carl Edwards, Brad Keselowski, and Matt Kenseth were the four drivers eliminated.Round 36: Ford EcoBoost 400Jeff Gordon won the pole for the race and dominated. Kevin Harvick took the lead from Denny Hamlin with 8 laps to go, but a late caution forced the race to have a 3 lap shootout. Harvick and Ryan Newman, who were the top of the 4 championship contenders, restarted on the front row. Harvick held off Newman to score his fifth win of the season and take the 2014 NASCAR Sprint Cup title. “I was just holding the pedal down and hoping for the best,’’ Harvick said. "This new format has been so stressful. I’m going to go sleep for a week." We didn't have quite enough,” Newman said. “That's disappointing, but like I said, it was an awesome team effort, and I think, again, this is a great racetrack to have a race like this, and I thought there was some amazing passing, and we don't get that at every racetrack.”

Results and standings

Races

Drivers' championship

(key) Bold – Pole position awarded by time. Italics – Pole position set by final practice results or owner's points. * – Most laps led.. – Eliminated after Challenger Round. – Eliminated after Contender Round.''' – Eliminated after Eliminator Round

Manufacturers' championship

See also

 2014 NASCAR Nationwide Series
 2014 NASCAR Camping World Truck Series
 2014 NASCAR K&N Pro Series East
 2014 NASCAR K&N Pro Series West
 2014 NASCAR Whelen Modified Tour
 2014 NASCAR Whelen Southern Modified Tour
 2014 NASCAR Canadian Tire Series
 2014 NASCAR Toyota Series
 2014 NASCAR Whelen Euro Series

References

 
NASCAR Cup Series seasons